The La Mouette Sphinx is a French high-wing, single-place and two-place family of hang gliders, designed and produced by La Mouette of Fontaine-lès-Dijon.

Design and development
The Sphinx is described by the manufacturer as "a beginner glider with a single surface and a floating crossbar".

The aircraft is made from aluminum tubing, with the single-surface wing covered in Dacron sailcloth. All models have a nose angle of 120°.

Variants
Sphinx
Single-place model for a wide range of pilot weights. The aircraft can be folded to a package  in length for ground transportation or storage.
Sphinx Bi
Large-size model for two-place flight training and familiarization. Swiss SHV certified. The manufacturer describes this model as "one of the most efficient two-seaters on the market, it is conceived to realize cross-country with a passenger."

Specifications (Sphinx)

References

External links

Sphinx
Hang gliders